Klaas-Erik Zwering (born 19 May 1981 in Eindhoven, North Brabant) is a former Dutch swimmer and an Olympic medalist. He is currently studying MBO entrepreneurship as he trained in Eindhoven with the PSV Eindhoven swim club. His personal coach was Jacco Verhaeren, who is also coach for Dutch swimming phenom Pieter van den Hoogenband.

Zwering originally specialized in the 200 meter backstroke, coming in seventh place in his first senior competition at the European Championships in Istanbul. In the 2000 Olympic Games in Sydney, he came in tenth place in the same event. Recently, however, he's been focusing exclusively on freestyle swimming.

In 2001 at the FINA World Championships in Fukuoka, Japan, Klaas-Erik was a member of the silver medal winning 4×100 meter freestyle relay team. Later, along with teammates Pieter van den Hoogenband, Johan Kenkhuis and Mitja Zastrow, Zwering won his first Olympic silver medal in the 4×100 meter freestyle relay in the 2004 Olympic Games in Athens, Greece. Afterwards he retired.

See also 
 Dutch records in swimming

External links
 Zwemkroniek online profile

References

1981 births
Living people
Dutch male backstroke swimmers
Dutch male freestyle swimmers
Olympic swimmers of the Netherlands
Swimmers at the 2004 Summer Olympics
Swimmers at the 2000 Summer Olympics
Olympic silver medalists for the Netherlands
Sportspeople from Eindhoven
World Aquatics Championships medalists in swimming
European Aquatics Championships medalists in swimming
Medalists at the 2004 Summer Olympics
Olympic silver medalists in swimming
Goodwill Games medalists in swimming
Competitors at the 2001 Goodwill Games
21st-century Dutch people